Orthetrum abbotti is a species of dragonfly in the family Libellulidae. Common names include little skimmer and Abbott's skimmer.

The species is found in most countries in sub-Saharan Africa, and also Jordan and Yemen. Its preferred habitats are small marshy spots (such as seeps, marshy verges of streams and grassy puddles) in grasslands and savannas.

This is a small Orthetrum; length 33–38 mm, wingspan 52–60 mm. Mature males are pale blue and the crest of the frons may be dark. The hook of the hamule is long and thin. Females and teneral males have only thin dark lines on the thorax.

References

External links

 Orthetrum abbotti on African Dragonflies and Damselflies Online

Libellulidae
Insects described in 1892
Taxonomy articles created by Polbot